The Tonkin Ministry was the 25th Ministry of the Government of Western Australia, led by Labor Premier John Tonkin and deputy Herb Graham (Don Taylor replaced Graham following his resignation on 30 May 1973). It commenced on 3 March 1971, eleven days after the Brand–Nalder Ministry, led by Premier David Brand of the Liberal Party, was defeated at the 1971 election. The ministry was followed by the Court–McPharlin Ministry on 8 April 1974 after the Labor Party lost government at the state election held on 31 March.

As was the norm for Labor ministries, the caucus consisting of all parliamentary members elected the ministers, and the Premier then allocated portfolios.

First Ministry

On 3 March 1971, the Governor, Major-General Sir Douglas Kendrew, constituted the Ministry. He designated 12 principal executive offices of the Government and appointed the following ministers to their positions, who served until a reshuffle on 30 May 1973. Four reshuffles took place—on 12 October 1971, following the resignation of Ron Bertram (due to ill health); a minor reshuffle amongst existing ministers on 6 July 1972; on 7 February 1973 following the resignation of William Willesee (also due to ill health); and on 30 May 1973 following the resignation of Deputy Premier Herb Graham to chair the Licensing Board.

The list below is ordered by decreasing seniority within the Cabinet, as indicated by the Government Gazette and the Hansard index. The members of the Ministry were:

Second Ministry
Following the resignation of Deputy Premier Herb Graham, a major reshuffle took place on 30 May 1973. These 12 ministers served until the end of the Tonkin Ministry on 8 April 1974.

Shadow Ministry 
While serving no formal status, the Tonkin shadow ministry was a Shadow Cabinet led by the Opposition Leader and leader of the Labor Party, John Tonkin, in the Parliament of Western Australia. It lasted from March 1974 until 15 April 1976, when Tonkin stepped down at the age of 74. The Tonkin shadow ministry was the first of its kind in Western Australia.

References

Western Australian ministries
Australian Labor Party ministries in Western Australia
Ministries of Elizabeth II